The Vilnius Mint was the main mint of the Grand Duchy of Lithuania which produced coins in Vilnius from 1387 to 1666 (with breaks). Many of the coins minted in the Vilnius Mint had privy marks of the Grand Treasurer of Lithuania (coat of arms and initials).

History 
The mints of gold and copper operated separately. In 1546, the mint was located on the present-day Vokiečių Street. Later, in the territory of Vilnius Lower Castle there were gold and, in the second half of the 17th century, copper mints. The mint was managed by a governor, who was assisted by a clerk (he took care of the acquisition, issuance, accounting, checked the quality of coins), other positions in the mint were: a money craftsman (he was responsible for the production of coins), a assayer, a stamps engraver, a bleacher, and money struckers.

The rent of the mint was practiced since the time of Grand Duke Stephen Báthory. Initially, it depended on the number of coins minted, from the time of Grand Duke Sigismund III Vasa an additional amount of determined sum of money was paid (700-800 gold coins; the amount increased if the mint was leased).

The Vilnius Mint was closed in 1666 and the coins were not minted anymore in the Lithuanian territory of the Polish-Lithuanian Commonwealth after the closure of the mint in Kaunas.

See also 
 Kaunas Mint (Grand Duchy of Lithuania)

References 

Grand Duchy of Lithuania
1387 establishments
Mints (currency)
14th-century establishments in Lithuania
Currencies of Lithuania
History of Vilnius
History of Lithuania (1569–1795)